is an interchange passenger railway station in located in the city of  Kawaguchi, Saitama, Japan, jointly operated by East Japan Railway Company (JR East) and the third sector railway operator Saitama Railway Corporation.

Lines
It is located 39.2 kilometers from Fuchūhommachi Station.

Station layout
The JR East part of the station consists of an elevated island platform serving two tracks, with the station building located underneath. The Saitama Railway part of the station is located underground, and also consists of an island platform serving two tracks.

JR East

Platforms

Facilities
The station has a "Midori no Madoguchi" staffed ticket office.

Saitama Railway

The station has an underground island platform serving two tracks. The platforms are equipped with waist-height platform edge doors.

Platforms

Facilities and accessibility
The station concourse and platforms have elevator access. Universal access toilets are available on the concourse level.

Passenger statistics
In fiscal 2019, the JR East station was used by an average of 36,918 passengers daily (boarding passengers only).  In fiscal 2019, the Saitama Railway station was used by an average of 16,934 passengers daily.

The JR East passenger figures for previous years are as shown below.

History
The JR East station opened on April 1, 1973, as one of the original stations on the then-Japanese National Railways (JNR) Musashino Line. With the privatization of JNR on 1 April 1987, the station came under the control of JR East. The Saitama Rapid Railway Line opened on 28 March 2001.

See also
 List of railway stations in Japan

References

External links

 Higashi-Kawaguchi Station (JR East) 
 Higashi-Kawaguchi Station (Saitama Railway) 
 Higashi-Kawaguchi Station (Saitama Prefectural Government) 

Railway stations in Saitama Prefecture
Railway stations in Japan opened in 2001
Stations of East Japan Railway Company
Railway stations in Kawaguchi, Saitama
Railway stations in Japan opened in 1973
Musashino Line